The Friendship of European railway modellers (FREMO) is a modular rail transport modelling standard. Individual track and scenery modules are built to a common standard and are joined together to make larger model railway layouts.
The FREMO standards were created following a meeting in Europe in 1981.

Modules are physically joined together using three  holes and hand-tightened M8 bolts with washers and wingnuts. The electrical inter-connection uses two Banana connectors per track bus, over which Digital Command Control (DCC) signalling running at 14 volts is used for train control.

Some general aspects, such as rigid construction of modules, are derived from the  NEM 900 standards published by MOROP.
In 1995, the North American Free-mo standards were based on those of FREMO, with a number of changes made.

North American Standards 
In 1994 Chris Palomarez and Art Armstrong at the San Luis Obispo Model Railroad Club (SLOMRC) developed the Free-mo Standard based on the European FREMO concept.

N-scale variant 
In 2004, the traditional Free-mo standard was adapted for N scale (1:160).

NMRA British Region Freemo Standard  
In 2011 the NMRA British Region released a set of standards called Freemo, Recommended Specifications For HO Scale Modules.

See also
 List of rail transport modelling scale standards

References

External links
 
 
 

Rail transport modelling